John Augustus Browne Marshall (23 October 1816 – December 1861) was an English cricketer. Marshall's batting style is unknown. He was born at Colombo in British Ceylon.

While studying at St John's College, Cambridge, Marshall made his debut in first-class cricket for the university cricket club against Cambridge Town Club in 1837 at Parker's Piece, making a further first-class appearance against the Marylebone Cricket Club (MCC). Later he became a travelling club cricketer in the West Country, and made further first-class appearances for the West of England against the MCC  in 1844 and 1845. In six first-class matches, Marshall scored 29 runs at an average of 3.22, with a highest score of 7.

He died at Penzance, Cornwall in December 1861. His brother Henry also played first-class cricket.

References

External links
John Marshall at ESPNcricinfo
John Marshall at CricketArchive

1816 births
1861 deaths
Cricketers from Colombo
Alumni of St John's College, Cambridge
English cricketers
Cambridge University cricketers
West of England cricketers
People from British Ceylon